Jacsson Antonio Wichnovski (born 12 March 1994), commonly known as Jacsson, is a Brazilian footballer who currently plays as a goalkeeper for Novo Hamburgo.

Career statistics

Club

Notes

References

1994 births
Living people
Brazilian footballers
Brazilian expatriate footballers
Brazil youth international footballers
Association football goalkeepers
Campeonato Brasileiro Série A players
Campeonato Brasileiro Série B players
Bolivian Primera División players
Sport Club Internacional players
Santa Cruz Futebol Clube players
Club Bolívar players
Associação Desportiva São Caetano players
Esporte Clube Novo Hamburgo players
Brazilian expatriate sportspeople in Bolivia
Expatriate footballers in Bolivia